Igor Klimov (born 1 June 1962) is a Kazakhstani former wrestler who competed in the 1996 Summer Olympics.

References

1962 births
Living people
Olympic wrestlers of Kazakhstan
Wrestlers at the 1996 Summer Olympics
Kazakhstani male sport wrestlers
Asian Games medalists in wrestling
Wrestlers at the 1994 Asian Games
Wrestlers at the 1998 Asian Games
Medalists at the 1994 Asian Games
Asian Games silver medalists for Kazakhstan
20th-century Kazakhstani people
21st-century Kazakhstani people